Donji Kosinj is a village in Perušić municipality, Lika-Senj County, Croatia. It is located Kosinj Valley, near the Lika river. The population is 494 (2011 census).

References

Ivan Mance: Kosinj izvorište hrvatske tiskane riječi, Split, 2013.

Populated places in Lika-Senj County